Micranoplium unicolor is a species of beetle in the family Cerambycidae, the only species in the genus Micranoplium.

References

Elaphidiini